The National Assembly was the lower house of the French parliament under the Fourth Republic, with the Council of the Republic being the upper house. It was established by the Constitution of 1946, dissolved by the Constitution of 1958 and replaced with a new chamber bearing the same name.

The institutional nature of the parliamentarian Fourth Republic has been described as a source of political instability by historians and jurists. The proportional voting system of the 1946 legislative election led to a "tripartisme" dominated by the Communists, the Socialists and the Popular Republican Movement, that ended up with the step down of communist ministers from the government in 1947.

The electoral law of 9 May 1951 introduced a voting system based on affiliations: it combined proportional representation with the possibility for the ballots to join forces in the counting and distribution of votes. This system was intended to give a stable majority to the government, as well as to reduce the influence of the Communist Party and the Rally of the French People in the parliament.

By creating the French Union, the 1946 constitution allowed a rising number of black deputies from French West Africa, French Equatorial Africa and French West Indies to be elected in the Assembly: from only one Senegalese representative in the Third Republic, black deputies were 21 in 1946 and 30 in 1958, the year of the founding of the Fifth Republic.

History 
The Constitution of 1946, adopted by the Constituent Assembly on 29 September 1946 and approved by referendum on 13 October 1946, led to the creation of a new bicameral parliament. The lower house, named Chamber of Deputies under the Third Republic, became the National Assembly.

Composition

References

Notes 

1946 establishments in France
1958 disestablishments in France
French Fourth Republic